14627 Emilkowalski is a stony asteroid from the central region of the asteroid belt, approximately  in diameter. It was discovered on 7 November 1998, by American astronomer Richard Kowalski at the Quail Hollow Observatory in Zephyrhills, Florida, United States. The asteroid is the namesake of the recently formed Emilkowalski family of asteroids. It was named after Emil Kowalski, mentor of the discoverer.

Orbit and classification 

Emilkowalski orbits the Sun in the central main-belt at a distance of 2.2–3.0 AU once every 4 years and 2 months (1,531 days). Its orbit has an eccentricity of 0.15 and an inclination of 18° with respect to the ecliptic.

The first unused observation at Palomar Observatory (DSS) dates back to 1953. The first used precovery was taken at Siding Spring Observatory in 1975, extending the asteroid's observation arc by 23 years prior to its discovery.

Emilkowalski family 

Emilkowalski is the biggest member and namesake of a collisional group of asteroids, that resulted from the destruction of a larger parent body. The disruption happened approximately 220,000 years ago and it is one of the most recent asteroid breakups discovered in the main belt. The recently formed stony Emilkowalski family (family identification number: 523) consist of only 4 identified members.

Naming 

This minor planet is named after American Emil Kowalski (1918–1994) from Syosset, New York, who inspired the discoverer of space science when he was still a child. The approved naming citation was published by the Minor Planet Center on 4 August 2001.

Physical characteristics 

Emilkowalski has been characterized as a rare DL-type by Pan-STARRS photometric survey. It has also been assigned a taxonomic type of a darker carbonaceous and a common stony asteroid, respectively.

Rotation period 

Between January and March 2012, photometric observations for this asteroid were made by a team led by Petr Pravec at Ondřejov Observatory, Czech Republic. The three obtained rotational lightcurves gave an identical period of  hours with a brightness variation of 0.55, 0.64 and 0.65 in magnitude, respectively. Previously, in 2008, a lightcurve was obtained from observations at the Simeiz Observatory and the Chuguev Observing Station in Ukraine, as well as at Maidanak Observatory in Uzbekistan. It also gave a period of 11.131 hours with an amplitude of 0.85 in magnitude, which implies an elongated shape.

Diameter and albedo 

According to the surveys carried out by NASA's Wide-field Infrared Survey Explorer with its subsequent NEOWISE mission, Emilkowalski measures between 6.98 and 7.84 kilometers in diameter and its surface has an albedo of 0.09 and 0.201.

The Collaborative Asteroid Lightcurve Link assumes a standard albedo for carbonaceous asteroids of 0.057 and hence calculates a larger diameter of 10.6 kilometers.

Notes

References

External links 
 Maidanak astronomical observatory (MAO), of the Ulugh Beg Astronomical Institute (UBAI), Uzbekistan Academy of Sciences
 Lightcurve Database Query (LCDB), at www.minorplanet.info
 Dictionary of Minor Planet Names, Google books
 Asteroids and comets rotation curves, CdR – Geneva Observatory, Raoul Behrend
 Discovery Circumstances: Numbered Minor Planets (10001)-(15000) – Minor Planet Center
 
 

014627
014627
Discoveries by Richard Kowalski
Named minor planets
19981107